William James Townley (14 February 1866 – 30 May 1950) was an English football player and coach.

He scored the first hat-trick in the history of the FA Cup final, but his lasting legacy is defined as an important pioneer of the game in Germany, leading Karlsruher FV and SpVgg Fürth to three German championships as a coach.

Playing career

Townley's career as a player began with Blackburn Swifts F.C., where he played for one season. He than joined Blackburn Olympic for two seasons. His playing position at Swifts and Olympic was centre-forward. He joined Blackburn Rovers in 1886 and switched to the left winger spot. Townleys technique to deter defending full-backs was to throw his arms up in the air, thus startling his opponent; Townley swept past to make an attack.
On 15 September 1888, Townley, playing as a winger, made his league debut at Leamington Road, then home of Blackburn Rovers, against Accrington. The match ended as a 5–5 draw, with Townley scoring the second and fourth goals for the Blackburn Rovers and becoming the team's top scorer temporarily.

Season 1888-1889

In the 1888–89 season, Townley played 19 league matches and scored eight league goals. As a winger, he played in a midfield that achieved big (three league goals or more) league wins on five separate occasions. In scoring eight league goals Townley scored two-in-a-match twice.
He played in all five FA Cup ties played by Blackburn Rovers in 1888-1889 at Outside-Left . He scored twice. He scored one of Blackburn' five goals on 9 February 1889, in a 5-0 win over  Accrington. The match was a First Round Replay (The match at Thorneyholme Road, Accrington was drawn 1-1). He also scored Blackburn' only goal in another replay. It was 23 March 1889 and the venue was the Alexandra Recreation Ground, Crewe. On 16 March 1889, at the same venue, Blackburn Rovers drew 1-1 with Wolverhampton Wanderers so the match was replayed one week later. Blackburn lost 3-1 and Townley scored Blackburn' goal.  He assisted Blackburn Rovers to win the FA Cup with the club in 1890 and 1891. In the first of these title appearances against The Wednesday, the outside left made history by contributing three goals in a 6–1 victory, earning the distinction of becoming the first player to score a hat-trick in an FA Cup final. He scored another goal in the successful defence of the title as the Rovers overcame Notts County 3–1 the following year. Townley's total of four goals in FA Cup finals has to date only been bettered once, by Liverpool's Ian Rush, who scored five goals in three finals appearances in the 1980s.

Townley was capped twice for England, in 1889 and 1890, scoring two goals in the second of those matches, which was a 9–1 victory over Ireland. In 1894 he moved to Darwen and played there for six years before joining Manchester City, where his playing career ended after he suffered a serious head injury.

Coaching career
At the end of his playing years Townley took up coaching as a profession, and as the opportunities were limited in England he left for the continent where football was beginning to develop a serious following. In Germany, as in the rest of Europe at the time, the game was strictly amateur in character and players often had to contribute to team expenses. For a club to have a coach was not yet a matter of course, but rather a luxury, as it was more common then for a senior player or club functionary to fill the role and carry out the tasks of a coach. Coaches were often hired for special occasions only, or for a brief period to help develop the skills of a team, before they moved on.

Townley's first coaching job was with DFC Prague who were beaten by VfB Leipzig in Germany's first national championship staged in 1903. He later joined Karlsruher FV, losing finalists in 1905, and led them to a their only national title in 1910.

The following year he was hired by the northern Bavarian club SpVgg Fürth. This club owned the most advanced facilities in Germany and was quickly becoming the largest club in the country with a membership approaching 3,000. Two months after his arrival Fürth lost against English side Newcastle United only 1–2. He guided the club to its first two Bavarian championships (Ostkreismeisterschaft) which heralded the onset of a golden era that would last into the 1930s which saw the club become one of the most dominant football sides in the country.

In December 1913 Townley got the call from Bayern Munich, but on a loan arrangement he re-joined Fürth in April of the following year to guide them through the national championship rounds. In the final Fürth captured its first national title, defeating defending champions VfB Leipzig, holders of a then record three German titles. It is not clear, but he may then have returned to Munich, before the horrors of World War I overtook the continent, obscuring knowledge of Townley's activities during this period.

He re-emerged with Bayern in 1919 and coached there until 1921, helping the club earn local and regional titles. It appears he was loaned to the Swiss club FC St. Gallen in August 1920 for what was probably a summer training camp. Townley's two tenures in Munich coincided with the first two terms of legendary Bayern President Kurt Landauer who oversaw the club's first national title victory in 1932 during his third term with the Austrian Richard Dombi – of later Feyenoord fame – as coach.

Afterward Townley moved to SV Waldhof Mannheim where he spent two months aiding in the club's preparations for the South German Championship. The team's campaign was cut short by eventual national champions 1. FC Nürnberg. It then appears that he may have coached in Sweden before joining SC Victoria Hamburg where he and his son, playing as a striker, spent a couple of seasons. The last months of the 1922-1923 season he trained both Be Quick 1887 and Forward from the Dutch town of Groningen. Half 1923 William Townley returned to St. Gallen where he stayed until February 1925.

Townley interrupted his time in Switzerland for a four-month stint with the Netherlands national team to guide them through the 1924 Olympics in Paris. In the semi-finals the Netherlands lost a closely fought match to Uruguay – the dominant side of that era who counted the legendary Andrade and Pedro Cea in their ranks – and had to settle for fourth place.

In May 1926 Townley rejoined SpVgg Fürth for the championship final in which they overcame Hertha BSC to win their second national title – the third national title to his credit. A year later he was coaching 1925 finalists FSV Frankfurt and spent some time working with nearby Union Niederrad.

In 1930 Townley returned for a third time to Fürth, with the club winning the South German Championship before being ousted from the national playoffs in the quarterfinals by the defending champions Hertha Berlin.

Now in his mid-60s, Townley took up his last known posting in 1932 with Arminia Hannover, then a strong regional side. Arminia defeated Dresdner SC in a quarterfinal match, but lost in the next round at home to eventual champions Fortuna Düsseldorf, starring the legendary Paul Janes. This marks the zenith of Arminia's achievement and the last significant role of a great pioneer of the game in Germany.

William Townley died in Blackpool, England in 1950 at the age of 84.

Honours and achievements

Playing career

England national team

23 February 1889 – British Home Championship – Stoke: England – Wales	4–1
15 March 1890 – British Home Championship – Belfast: Ireland – England 1–9 (2 goals by Townley)

Coaching career
{| class=wikitable
|-
!Years
!Club
!Details
!Year
!Titles
|-
||19??–1909||Deutscher FC Prag||||||
|-
||1909–1911||Karlsruher FV||</td>1910 ||Championship
|- style="vertical-align:top"
||1911–1913||SpVgg Fürth||04/1911 – 12/1913||19121913||Bavarian ChampionshipBavarian Championship
|-
||1914||Bayern Munich||01/1914 – 04/1914||||
|-
||1914||SpVgg Fürth||04/1914 – 05/1914||1914 ||Championship
|-
||1914||Bayern Munich||||||
|-   style="vertical-align:top"
||1919–1921||Bayern Munich||||1920||Champion Munich,Champion Southern Bavaria
|-
||1920||St. Gallen (CH)||08/1920||||
|-
||1921||Waldhof Mannheim||01/1921 – 03/1921||||
|-
||192?–1923||SC Victoria Hamburg||||||
|-
||1923–1925||St. Gallen (CH)||1923 – 02/1925||||
|-
||1924||Netherlands (National)||03/1924-06/1924||1924||Olympics, 4th place
|- style="vertical-align:top"
||1926–1927||SpVgg Fürth||05/1926 – 09/1927||19261927||ChampionshipSouth German Cup
|-
||192?–19??||FSV Frankfurt||||||
|-
||1930–1932||SpVgg Fürth||09/30 – 06/1932||1931||Champion South Germany
|-
||1932 (?)||Eintracht Hannover||||||
|-  style="vertical-align:top"
||1932-193x||Arminia Hannover||||1933||Champion North Germany(Southern District)
|}
Not verified engagements:
Sweden
FC Union Niederrad 07 (ca. 1927/1930)

References

External links

SpVgg Greuther Fürth
"El Bombin" – Tales of British Football Coaches Around the World
Billy Townley: Blackburn Rovers at spartacus-educational.com – the facts from the biography.
England career profile

1866 births
1950 deaths
Footballers from Blackburn
English footballers
Association football forwards
Association football wingers
England international footballers
FA Cup Final players
Blackburn Olympic F.C. players
Blackburn Rovers F.C. players
Darwen F.C. players
Manchester City F.C. players
English football managers
Karlsruher FV managers
SpVgg Greuther Fürth managers
FC Bayern Munich managers
FC St. Gallen managers
SV Waldhof Mannheim managers
SC Victoria Hamburg managers
Hamburger SV managers
Netherlands national football team managers
FSV Frankfurt managers
English expatriate football managers
English expatriate sportspeople in Germany
Expatriate football managers in Germany
English expatriate sportspeople in the Netherlands
Expatriate football managers in the Netherlands
English expatriate sportspeople in Switzerland
Expatriate football managers in Switzerland